Phytoecia rufovittipennis is a species of beetle in the family Cerambycidae. It was described by Stephan von Breuning in 1971. It is known from India.

References

Phytoecia
Beetles described in 1971